John Cadwalader Grady (October 8, 1847 – March 5, 1916) was an American lawyer and politician from Pennsylvania who served as a Republican member of the Pennsylvania Senate for the 7th district from 1877 to 1903 including as President Pro Tempore from 1887 to 1890.

Early life and education
Grady was born in Eastport, Maine to Irish immigrant John O'Grady and Eliza Daggett.  The family moved to Philadelphia, Pennsylvania when he was young and he attended the Philadelphia public schools. He began his career as a bookkeeper for Gould & Company.  Grady graduated from the University of Pennsylvania Law School and was admitted to the Pennsylvania bar in 1871. He practiced law in Philadelphia.

Career
From 1877 to 1905, Grady served in the Pennsylvania State Senate and was president pro tempore of the state senate in 1887 and 1889. From 1907 to 1909, Grady served as Philadelphia Department of Docks, Wharves, and Ferries. He never married and died in a Philadelphia hospital after suffering a stroke. He was interred at the Mount Moriah Cemetery in Philadelphia.

Notes

External links

1847 births
1916 deaths
19th-century American politicians
20th-century American politicians
Burials at Mount Moriah Cemetery (Philadelphia)
Lawyers from Philadelphia
Republican Party Pennsylvania state senators
People from Eastport, Maine
Politicians from Philadelphia
Presidents pro tempore of the Pennsylvania Senate
University of Pennsylvania Law School alumni
19th-century American lawyers